Peru competed at the 1976 Summer Olympics in Montreal, Canada. An all-female delegation of 13 competitors took part in 3 events in 2 sports.

Athletics

Women
Track events

Combined event – Pentathlon

Volleyball

Volleyball

Women's Team Competition
Preliminary round (group A)
 Defeated Canada (3-2)
 Lost to Japan (0-3)
 Lost to Hungary (1-3)
Classification Matches
 5th/8th place: Lost to East Germany (2-3)
 7th/8th place: Defeated Canada (3-1) → Seventh place
Team roster
Mercedes Gonzales
María Cardenas
Teresa Núñez
Irma Cordero
Ana Carrillo
Luisa Merea
Delia Cordova
Silvia Quevedo
Luisa Fuentes
María Del-Risco
María Cervera
María Ostolaza
Head coach: Man Bok-Park

References
Official Olympic Reports

Nations at the 1976 Summer Olympics
1976 Summer Olympics
1976 in Peruvian sport